Phytoliriomyza dorsata is a species in the family Agromyzidae ("leaf miner flies"), in the order Diptera ("flies").

References

Further reading

External links
Diptera.info
NCBI Taxonomy Browser, Phytoliriomyza dorsata

Agromyzidae
Insects described in 1864